Michael Grant may refer to:

Entertainment
 Michael Grant (classicist) (1914–2004), English author of books on ancient history
 Michael Grant (crime writer) (born 1940), New York policeman and author of police procedurals
 Michael Grant (television) (born 1951), Arizona television personality
 Michael Grant (author, born 1954), author of the Gone series
 Michael Grant, American actor in The Secret Life of the American Teenager

Sports
 Michael Grant (American football) (born 1986), American football player
 Michael Grant (basketball) (born 1963), American college basketball coach
 Michael Grant (boxer) (born 1972), heavyweight boxer
 Michael Grant (tennis) (born 1956), American tennis player
 Mike Grant (1873–1955), Canadian ice hockey player
 Mick Grant (born 1944), English motorcycle road racer

Other
 Michael Grant, 12th Baron de Longueuil (born 1947), nobleman with only French colonial title recognized by King/Queen of Canada
 Michael J. Grant (born 1949), member of the Florida House of Representatives
 Michael Grant (musician), guitarist and founder of Endeverafter
 Michael S. K. Grant, British IT professional

See also